Cléber Machado Santana (born 26 May 1990) is a Brazilian footballer who currently plays as a goalkeeper for Cova da Piedade.

Career statistics

Club

Notes

References

1990 births
Living people
Brazilian footballers
Brazilian expatriate footballers
Brasiliense Futebol Clube players
Sociedade Esportiva do Gama players
Sertanense F.C. players
A.C. Alcanenense players
S.C.U. Torreense players
S.C. Olhanense players
Académico de Viseu F.C. players
Amora F.C. players
C.D. Cova da Piedade players
Liga Portugal 2 players
Brazilian expatriate sportspeople in Portugal
Expatriate footballers in Portugal
Association football goalkeepers
Sportspeople from Salvador, Bahia